KCDA (103.1 FM) is a hot adult contemporary outlet owned by iHeartMedia. The station offers up a mix of familiar new music with less talk. Its city of license is Post Falls, Idaho, and it serves the Spokane area at an effective radiated power of 18.5 kW.

History
KCDA was a country music station from 1991 until its flip to its current format in 1999.

After KEZE flipped from AAA to Rhythmic CHR in 2012, KCDA added more Adult Alternative product, becoming a hybrid of Hot AC/AAA.
Recently, KCDA went back to a straight forward hot AC format.  KCDA has been Spokane's home for American Top 40 with Ryan Seacrest since sister station KPXR flipped back to country.  They are now alternative KFOO-FM.  KCDA competes with 92.9 ZZU.

External links
Station website

CDA
Hot adult contemporary radio stations in the United States
Post Falls, Idaho
Radio stations established in 1979
1979 establishments in Idaho
IHeartMedia radio stations